Haverfordwest railway station serves the town of Haverfordwest in Pembrokeshire, Wales.

Whilst the station has two platforms (as the site of the only passing loop on this section), most trains use platform one as it is adjacent to the entrance and ticket office.

Facilities
The station is staffed during the daytime (07:00 – 13:30, Mondays to Saturdays only) and has toilet facilities, a newspaper kiosk, ticket office and a station buffet on platform one. For times when the station building is closed, an automated ticket kiosk allows passengers to buy tickets with a debit or credit card, or to collect tickets from purchases made online. Train running information is provided by digital CIS displays, timetable posters and telephone.  Step-free access is only possible to platform one, as the only route to platform two is via a stepped footbridge.

A bus stop outside the station allows interchanges with services to St Davids, Fishguard and Cardigan, as well as a direct service to Aberystwyth. There is also a Taxi rank directly outside the station.

Services
InterCity 125 services stopped at Haverfordwest until the early 1990s, terminating in 1994.

Awards
Haverfordwest railway station has received a number of awards, including Anglo-Irish Best Station Awards in 1991 and 1992. The station was refurbished in 2002 and officially re-opened on 25 April 2002.

References

External links 

Railway stations in Pembrokeshire
DfT Category D stations
Former Great Western Railway stations
Railway stations in Great Britain opened in 1854
Railway stations served by Transport for Wales Rail
railway station